The 2010 VLN Series was the 33rd season of the VLN.

The third race was overshadowed by the fatal accident of Leo Löwenstein. With around 40 minutes to go, Löwenstein, driving the No. 83 Aston Martin Vantage, came upon two backmarkers, the No. 137 Lexus IS F and the No. 511 BMW 130i, who were themselves fighting for position. Löwenstein attempted to pass between the two cars near Bergwerk, but connected with one of them, took off and rolled several times. The car hit the barriers with an impact that ruptured its fuel cell, landing upside down and ablaze. Marshals arrived on the scene within seconds but neither they nor Löwenstein himself were able to extricate him from the wreckage. He succumbed to smoke inhalation.

Calendar

Race Results
Results indicate overall winners only.

Footnotes

References

External links 
 
 

2010 in German motorsport
Nürburgring Endurance Series seasons